The Orange Kabelano Charity Cup is a football (soccer) one match competition in Botswana. It was created in 1996 and the participation in this one-day event is decided by invitation or by a public vote.

Winners/Finalists
1996 : Extension Gunners (Lobatse)
1997 : Mochudi Centre Chiefs
1998 : Extension Gunners (Lobatse)
1999-00 : Not played
2001 : Extension Gunners (Lobatse)
2002 : Township Rollers (Gaborone) 1-0 Notwane (Gaborone)     
2003 : Gaborone United
2004 : Township Rollers (Gaborone) 1-0 Extension Gunners (Lobatse)
2005 : Mochudi Centre Chiefs 2-0 Extension Gunners (Lobatse)
2006 : Township Rollers (Gaborone) 4-2 Notwane (Gaborone)     
2007 : Notwane (Gaborone) 3-1 Mochudi Centre Chiefs (aet)
2008 : Mochudi Centre Chiefs (Mochudi) 2-0 ECCO City Greens
2014 : Township Rollers (Gaborone) 1(6)-(5)1 Mochudi Centre Chiefs No Extra time

External links
RSSSF competition history

Football competitions in Botswana